The Technical University metro station is situated intermediate on Saburtalo Line in Tbilisi, Georgia. The station has two entrances, the western from the intersections of Pekini avenue and Bakhtrioni street and the eastern from Merab Kostava street. Near the station are such important places as the Georgian Technical University, 26 May Square, the Sports Palace, and the Holiday Inn (former Hotel Adjara).

Gallery

External links
 Metro Web-site
 Tbilisi Metro on Urbanrail.net
 Metrosoyuza

References

Railway stations opened in 1979
Saburtalo
Tbilisi Metro stations
1979 establishments in Georgia (country)